The 1144 papal election followed the death of Pope Celestine II and resulted in the election of Pope Lucius II.

Election of Lucius II
Pope Celestine II died on 8 March 1144 at Rome, after a pontificate of only five months. The election of his successor took place in the shadow of this municipal revolution, which opposed the secular rule of the Pope. Celestine II was unable to recover full control over the city of Rome; in addition he had to face also the demands of the king Roger II of Sicily. This problem remained unresolved on his death, because he had refused to confirm the privileges granted to Roger by his predecessor Innocent II.

The cardinals present at Rome elected Cardinal Gerardo Caccianemici, priest of the titulus of S. Croce in Gerusalemme and former canon regular of S. Frediano di Lucca. The details concerning the place of the election or the exact date of electoral proceedings are not registered. Since the elect was chancellor of the Holy See and close collaborator of both Innocent II and Celestine II, it may be assumed that the cardinals wanted to continue their policy, friendly towards the Empire and hostile towards the king Roger. The elect took the name Lucius II and received episcopal consecration on 12 March 1144.

Cardinal-electors
There were probably 39 cardinals in the Sacred College of Cardinals in March 1144. Based on examination of the subscriptions of the papal bulls in 1144 and the available data about the external missions of the cardinals, it is possible to establish that no more than 36 cardinals participated in the election:

Twenty two electors were created by Pope Innocent II, ten by Celestine II, two by Pope Callixtus II and one by Pope Paschalis II.

Absentees

Notes

Sources

12th-century elections
1144
1144
1144 in Europe
12th-century Catholicism